Coastal Hydrogeology is a branch of Hydrogeology that focuses on the movement and the chemical properties of groundwater in coastal areas. Coastal Hydrogeology studies the interaction between fresh groundwater and seawater, including seawater intrusion, sea level induced groundwater level fluctuation, submarine groundwater discharge, human activities and groundwater management in coastal areas.

The freshwater-seawater interface is a dynamic boundary where freshwater mixes with seawater. An interface in Coastal Hydrogeology refers to the location that freshwater from aquifer meets seawater. Steady freshwater-seawater interface is an equilibrium stage where the boundary locates in a relatively fixed location, while seawater intrusion or a strong recharge rate breaks the equilibrium, leading to an unsteady freshwater-seawater interface. Mixing of groundwater and seawater creates a special chemical system that is a good indicator to show the interaction and the interface.

Human activities such as pumping of groundwater and land reclamation break the equilibrium, leading to seawater intrusion, development of a seepage zone or pollution of the ocean. The interaction between groundwater system and the ocean is complex. Preventive actions and engineering measurements are adopted to mitigate the impacts.

Freshwater-Seawater Interface 
Freshwater – Seawater interface or saltwater interface is an essential aspect in Coastal Hydrogeology that tries to figure out the location of the transition zone or mixing zone between freshwater and seawater. A sharp interface is formed when the transition zone is thin or narrow. Coastal aquifers can be classified in the same three categories as all aquifer systems: Sedimentary Aquifers, Hard Rock Aquifers and Limestone Aquifers.

Ghijben – Herzberg Principle 
The Ghijben – Herzberg Principle formulated the water table and the boundary of groundwater in an island or unconfined aquifer should form a lens-shape. This principle can estimate the bottom boundary of the interface which provides a general idea of the capacity of an aquifer. By estimating the capacity of an aquifer, we can find out the available groundwater resource in some regions.

Freshwater-Seawater Interface in Coastal Aquifers 
It is assumed that the aquifers below are homogeneous in the different models so that the hydraulic conductivity of each aquifer is uniform.

The above figures simulate possible coastal aquifers. In reality, it is complex. Due to complex geology - non-uniform rock layers and weathering, both confined and unconfined aquifers can be found within a coast. It is possible to have multiple confined aquifers at the bottom and an unconfined aquifers at the top of a coast.

Seawater Intrusion 

Seawater intrusion is a process where seawater intrudes into a freshwater aquifer. Natural or anthropogenic factors can cause seawater intrusion. Salinization of a freshwater aquifer can be caused by the inflow of seawater due to a change in groundwater pressure, reduction in water recharge, reduction in groundwater discharge, or other sources of salt entering the aquifer. The transition zone or the interface would shift either to the land or shift vertically. Sea level rise, flooding or tsunami also leads to saltwater intrusion into the freshwater aquifer.

Pumping-Induced Saltwater Up-coning 

Pumping of groundwater from a well near the interface could cause seawater up-coning where seawater intrudes vertically to the aquifer. When the pumping rate exceeds the maximum pumping rate or critical pumping rate, seawater would be pumped out.

Effects of Heterogeneity and Anisotropy 
Aquifers should be anisotropic and heterogeneous. A high permeability layer is associated with the freshwater flow. If the hydraulic conductivity of an aquifer in a vertical direction is lower than the horizontal direction, the transition zone would shift more in a horizontal direction.

Tides 
Tides can push the transition zone towards the land and widen the transition zone. Tides can strengthen the freshwater seawater mixing due to dampening of the tidal pressure forming the non-uniform flow of groundwater. The greater the tidal amplitude, the greater the mixing effect. Less dampening in an aquifer would lead to a more uniform flow.

Other factors 
Geological structures that cross-cut different layers such as faults or dykes can affect the direction and velocity of seawater intrusion.  Dykes, an igneous unit that is impermeable or low in hydraulic conductivity might stop the intrusion of seawater. Faults also affect the direction of water flow which is studied by Fault Zone Hydrogeology. Both regular and catastrophic flooding can cause downward intrusion of seawater recreating the transition zone of the fresh-salt water. Diffusion would also be responsible for seawater intrusion, as there is a net flow of solutes from high concentration to low concentration. For example, a complete salinization of a 10 m thick layer of freshwater takes thousands of years through diffusion. Other factors can be pumping-induced seawater intrusion.

Submarine Groundwater Discharge 

Submarine groundwater discharge (SGD) is the groundwater flows across the interface of the aquifer and the sea. It refers to the flow of water shifting towards the sea. Nearshore submarine groundwater discharge is defined as a range of 0 to 10 m, embayment SGD is defined as 10 m to 10 km and offshore SGD is defined as more than 10 km. Topography, salinity and temperature convention and tidal pumping are  responsible for the driving force for the submarine groundwater discharge.

Topography-Driven Flow 
The topography and geology of an area affect the permeability and flow network of groundwater. For an unconfined aquifer, groundwater discharges would be near shore and discharge decreases with the propagation towards the sea. For confined aquifers, groundwater can flow further towards the sea to the embayment zone or even develop submarine springs.

Groundwater Tidal Dynamics 

Periodic sea level changes by tides would cause a fluctuation in the groundwater level of a coastal aquifer system. The tidal signal of sea tides becomes more attenuated and delayed with increasing distance to the land. Water level fluctuations in the wells can be caused by the degree of connection between the ocean and the aquifer; groundwater flows well connected to the sea; alternating loading and unloading of the sea tide leads to plastic deformation. Tidal efficiency of the magnitude of the oscillation of water level in a well to the oscillation of sea level is about 42% to 44%.  For example, if the magnitude of the oscillation of the sea level is 1 meter, the magnitude of the oscillation of water level will be 0.42 to 0.44 meter. However, the further away from the coast, the groundwater fluctuation would be lower.

Chemistry of Coastal Groundwater Systems 
The coastal groundwater system consists of terrestrial (freshwater) groundwater, seawater and a mixture of two. Rainfall is the main source of the recharge of terrestrial groundwater. In the mixing zone, dilution occurs that results in the different chemical compositions of water there.

Salinity 
Marine, natural terrestrial and anthropogenic terrestrial is the source of salinity. The total dissolved solids (TDS) of the ocean are between 33 to 36.5 gl-1. The TDS of standard seawater at 25oC is 36gl-1. TDS of seawater would be lower near the coast as there is fresh water supply through a river. The charge in TDS of seawater can indicate the existence of groundwater supply, submarine spring and the transition zone.

Electrical Conductivity 
Electrical conductivity (EC) is another way to explain salinity. Electrical conductivity shows the ability of water to carry electrical current. Higher electrical conductivity reflects a higher concentration of dissolved ions. Electrical conductivity increases by 2% when the temperature increases by 1oC.

Chemical Composition of Terrestrial Groundwater 
Terrestrial groundwater is dominated by cations: potassium (K+), sodium (Na+), calcium (Ca+) and magnesium (Mg+) and anions: chlorine (Cl-), biocarbonate (HCO3-) and sulfate (SO42-). Each ion has a concentration of >1mgl-1. The chemical composition highly depends on the geology which is the composition of local rocks and the chemical composition of recharge sources like rainfall and rivers. Fresh groundwater is likely alkaline as there is calcium and magnesium.

Chemical Composition of Seawater 
Seawater is dominated by sodium (Na+) and chlorine (Cl-). The chemical composition of seawater has small variability between different oceans due to the long residence time which facilitates mixing.

Chemical Processes in Coastal Aquifer 

Physical and chemical reactions occur in coastal aquifers, including oxidation-reduction reactions, mineral dissolution and precipitation, acid-base reactions, ion exchange, and gases dissolution and exsolution. Those chemical processes also happen in terrestrial aquifer system. The rate of different chemical processes depend on temperature and pressure of different part of the aquifers. Rain is the major recharge for different aquifers. Thus, groundwater would be acidic. Groundwater becomes less acidic with increases flow path or flow distance.

Ion Exchange 
Seawater mainly contains sodium and chlorine while fresh groundwater is dominated by calcium and bicarbonate. Cation exchange occurs in the transition zone given by the chemical equation:

Na++1/2Ca-X2 → 1/2Ca2++Na-X,

where X is the exchange site on the soil particles. Compared to seawater, the water in the transition zone would have excess calcium and be depleted in sodium. Compare with fresh water, it is the opposite case. Other cations like magnesium and potassium exchange as well. Magnesium and calcium would be exchanged for sodium.

In a limestone aquifer, calcite dissolves due to the acidity of groundwater. With the presence of magnesium, dolomite may form in the transition zone.

Mineral Dissolution and Precipitation 
As rain is acidic, it dissolves different minerals. For example, rain dissolves calcite or dolomite inside the aquifer. In the transition zone where fresh groundwater meets seawater, dolomitization occurs due to abundant magnesium of seawater. Lead to precipitation of dolomite.

Reduction-Oxidation Reactions 
Reduction-Oxidation reactions (Redox) takes place in the recharge areas where organic matter is available. Oxygen dissolves into freshwater when rainfall or river penetrates soil with organic matter. Oxygen may lost under redox reactions and microbiological processes. Oxidation of pyrite or sulphide minerals also consume the dissolved oxygen inside water. Dissolved oxygen concentration level in groundwater decreases during long travel distance. Anaerobic conditions occur in deep confined aquifer. Under anaerobic conditions, sulphate reduction, methanogenesis and ferric iron reduction might occur. Leading to dissolve of iron, manganese, nitrogen dioxide, nitrogen, methane and hydrogen sulfide into groundwater.

Chemical and Isotopic Indicators 
The change in the chemical composition of groundwater is an indicator of seawater intrusion. It prevents the multi-sources of chloride, leading to a change in salinity of groundwater. Chemical concentration ratios including Na/Cl, Ca/Cl, Mg/Ca, Cl/Br, Ca/Mg and Cl/HCO3 can be used to distinguish the seawater intrusion.

Anthropogenic Impacts

Reclamation 

Land reclamation is a way to create flat land in coastal areas for coastal urban development. Reclamations affect regional groundwater flow systems, the location of groundwater discharge zones, seepage zones, groundwater divide, the interface between seawater and fresh groundwater and the water chemistry. It takes years to decades to reach a new equilibrium after reclamation.

Reclamation – Chemical and Groundwater Change 

Land-fill materials would change the equilibrium of the coastal areas. Land-fill materials interact with groundwater, seawater and marine sediments chemically and physically. Fill materials can be sand, completely weathered igneous rock or even waste. The placement of fill materials and diversity of fill materials can make the aquifer heterogeneous. It is difficult to determine the chemical change in groundwater in a general way. It depends on the fill materials.

The groundwater discharge after reclamation decreases as the fill increases subsurface flow path length. As a result, the water level elevation in the upstream or attitude would rise. Rainfall recharges the new land and increases the storage capacity of the land. Increasing the water level and seaward groundwater discharge and shifting the water divide in the future. Lengthening of the groundwater flow paths can dissolve the pollutants inside the marine mud and bring the pollutants to the ocean.

Sea Level Changes to Coastal Hydrogeology 

Sea level rise and flooding would push the interface towards the land. Thus, seawater intrudes the land vertically and horizontally. A reduction in the recharge area leads to a reduction in the discharge of groundwater and groundwater level. For islands, sea level rise would reduce the freshwater volume resulting in a smaller freshwater lens. Sea level rise also increases the coastal erosion rate leading to shoreline retreat.

Seawater Intrusion Management 
Seawater intrusion leads to social and economic loss. It is important to promote seawater intrusion management to prevent seawater intrusion including increases in freshwater recharge, pumping control, well design improvement, building barriers and land and water management.

Increase of Freshwater Recharge 
For areas that have sufficient fresh water supply, fresh water can be injected into the aquifers named aquifer storage and recovery (ASR). Apart from injection to pumping wells, infiltration basins or canals are used for infiltration and the replenishment of groundwater.

Well Design Improvements 

Improvements on the location and design of a well can minimize the effect of seawater intrusion. For example, building a well that is close to the water table, having a well that far away from the transition zone. Multiple wells with low pumping rate, horizontal pumping wells and radial wells can be built to reduce the chance of seawater intrusion.  As well as calculating the maximum pumping rate and critical pumping rate of a well. Prevent the pumping rate from exceeding the limit which is over-pumping.

Engineered Barriers 

Engineered barriers can be built to reduce freshwater flow to the sea and seawater intrusion into the aquifer. Engineered barriers can be hydraulic barriers or physical barriers. Hydraulic barriers operate by injecting fresh water into the well or pumping saltwater from the well. Water from rivers, precipitation, and treated wastewater can be injected into the well. The location of the injection well should be far away from the pumping well to prevent the neutralization of pumping and injection of water. Physical barriers are impermeable walls, that cut off the interaction between fresh groundwater and seawater. Cut-off walls have been built since the 1970s. Slurry walls and grout walls are a type of cut-off walls. Slurry walls are made of water, soil and bentonite or concrete, forming an impermeable wall. Grout walls are made of cement, bentonite or silicate reagents.

See also 

 Hydrogeology
 Fault zone hydrogeology
 Groundwater
 Groundwater recharge
 Saltwater intrusion
 Salinity
 Total dissolved solids
 Tides
 Submarine groundwater discharge
 Well
 Isotope hydrology

References 

Hydrology
Oceans